Viola Davis (born March 19, 1963) is an American businesswoman, nurse, and politician who has served as a member of the Georgia House of Representatives from DeKalb County, Georgia. A member of the Democratic Party, she defeated Democratic Party incumbent Earnest "Coach" Williams in November 2018.

Early life and education
Davis grew up in Topeka, Kansas and in 1979 and was part of the third phase of Brown vs. Board of Education after schools began to drift back to segregation following a change to open enrollment. She earned a Bachelor of Science degree in nursing from the Medical College of Georgia.

Career 
Prior to entering politics, Davis worked as a critical care nurse and community missionary. She also operated a hair salon and served in the United States Army. She received her real estate license in 1997.

References

People from Stone Mountain, Georgia
Living people
Democratic Party members of the Georgia House of Representatives
Women state legislators in Georgia (U.S. state)
21st-century American politicians
21st-century American women politicians
African-American state legislators in Georgia (U.S. state)
1963 births
21st-century African-American women
21st-century African-American politicians
20th-century African-American people
20th-century African-American women